The 1969 Copa Libertadores de América was a football competition contested between the top clubs of the CONMEBOL federation. Estudiantes won the competition defeating Nacional 4–0 on points over two-legs. The CBD declared that no Brazilian club would play in the 1969 Copa Libertadores de América, since Brazil disagreed on the format of the tournament, whose dates would conflict with the preparation of the national team for the 1970 World Cup Qualifying matches.

Qualified teams

Group stage

Group 1

Group 2

Group 3

Group 4

Second round

Group 1

Group 2

Group 3

Semi-finals

Finals

Champion

References

External links
 Tournament on RSSSF

1
Copa Libertadores seasons